He Makes Me Feel Like Dancin' is a 1983 American documentary film directed by Emile Ardolino.

Summary
Jacques d'Amboise, a noted former American ballet star who had dancing roles in such films as Seven Brides for Seven Brothers and Carousel, and who later founded the National Dance Institute, a dance school. Kevin Kline and Judy Collins make appearances as themselves. It aired on television on the NBC anthology series Special Treat.

Reception
John J. O'Connor of The New York Times stated that the production "captured splendidly the key point of Mr. d'Amboise's efforts: Doing your best is what counts." In the educational magazine Media & Methods, Marion Bue called He Makes Me Feel Like Dancin''' "engaging" and wrote that the film "captures the intensity of rehearsal and the excitement of performance."

AccoladesHe Makes Me Feel Like Dancin'  won the 1983 Academy Award for Best Documentary Feature.1984|Oscars.org After it was shown on NBC, He Makes Me Feel Like Dancin' '' won the 1984 Primetime Emmy Award for Outstanding Children's Program and a Peabody Award. It is one of the few theatrical films to win both an Oscar and an Emmy. It was also nominated for a Daytime Emmy Award for Outstanding Children's Entertainment Special.

References

External links
''He Makes Me Feel Like Dancin''' at the Internet Movie Database.
 
 

1983 films
American documentary films
Documentary films about ballet
Best Documentary Feature Academy Award winners
Peabody Award-winning broadcasts
Films directed by Emile Ardolino
1983 documentary films
Primetime Emmy Award-winning broadcasts
1980s English-language films
1980s American films